The Cavalcade of Bands is one of many competitive band organizations in the United States and is one of several major circuits in the mid-Atlantic states (other circuits include Tournament of Bands and USBands). Cavalcade was founded in the late 1958 by the members of the Mid-Atlantic Judges Association and its member high schools. The organization currently has over 145 member schools. It provides competitive performance opportunities for marching bands and jazz ensembles. Cavalcade sanctions approximately 42 field band events as well as about 25 jazz ensemble events annually. Formerly, Cavalcade also sanctioned indoor percussion, color guard, and dance team competitions, but for the 2020 season have discontinued this aspect of their program.

Marching Band
The Cavalcade of Bands sanctions about 42 high school marching band competitions throughout each fall from September to mid-November. Bands are judged on a 100-point linear scale by judges both on the field and in the press box. Bands are placed into one of five classes based on their size, and judged only within their class.

The five classes are: 
Independence (1-30 members) 
American (31-45 members) 
Liberty (46-65 members) 
Yankee (66-90 members)
Patriot (91+ members)

During championship week, bands are divided once more within their class based on their average score throughout the season. Bands with the higher scores are placed into the "Open" division and bands with the lower scores are placed into the "A" division.

On January 1, 2019, the Cavalcade of Bands Honor Band performed in the Rose Parade in Pasadena, California. The band included over 100 students from 20 high schools in the Mid-Atlantic region.

List of Champions

Notes
: The 2020 outdoor marching band season was canceled due to the COVID-19 pandemic
: Independence A 'Ferraro' Champions
: Independence A 'Saylor' Champions

Indoor activities
Cavalcade of Bands has discontinued the "Cavalcade Indoor Association" portion of their program beginning in the 2019-2020 school year. Information below refers to Cavalcade-sponsored indoor events prior to 2020. 

The Cavalcade Indoor Association is one of several circuits for indoor shows in the mid-Atlantic states (other circuits include MAIN, TOB, KIDA, and TRWEA). The indoor season generally runs from late January to the first weekend in May. Classifications are as follows:

 Middle School/Junior - For students in middle school or up to the age of 14.
 Regional A - For color guards only
 Novice - For color guards and percussion
 A class - For color guards and percussion
 Open class - For Percussion Only
 World class - For Percussion Only

All units entering the championship contest must be members in good standing of CIA. Championship Seeding is determined by the average of the last two shows completed.

External links
Cavalcade of Bands Official Website

Marching band competitions